George Ian Town FRACP is a New Zealand respiratory scientist and health official. He was appointed the Chief Science Advisor to the New Zealand Ministry of Health in 2019.

Education and research 
After graduating MB ChB at the University of Otago, Town completed a Doctor of Medicine higher degree at the University of Southampton in 1991, with a thesis entitled The role of inflammation in oxygen-induced lung injury in the preterm guinea pig.

Town is a physician and has published on evidence-based guidelines for respiratory medicine, particularly asthma, COPD and pneumonia. He is a Fellow of the Royal Australasian College of Physicians.

Town has publicly stated that the research on the drug Ivermectin doesn't show that the drug is effective at treating COVID-19 and claimed that it has dangerous side affects. Though he has voiced support for other protease inhibiting drugs.

Employment 
Town was the Dean of the University of Otago in Christchurch from 2002 to 2005. He was the Deputy Vice-Chancellor of the University of Canterbury from 2005 to 2013. He has been Chair of the Performance Based Research Fund Sector Reference Group and Chair of the Tertiary Education Commission PBRF Governance Group. He was the Chair of Te Papa Hauora/Christchurch Health Precinct Advisory Council, advising on the post-earthquake rebuild, for five years.

Town was appointed as Chief Science Advisor to the Ministry of Health in July 2019. His role at the Ministry was originally part-time, and involved working with MBIE and the Health Research Council to implement the New Zealand Health Research Strategy 2017–2027. When COVID-19 arrived in New Zealand his background in respiratory medicine led to his advising full-time on the New Zealand response to COVID-19.

Selected publications

References 

University of Otago alumni
Alumni of the University of Southampton
Academic staff of the University of Otago
Academic staff of the University of Canterbury
Fellows of the Royal Australasian College of Physicians
New Zealand scientists
Year of birth missing (living people)
Living people